...And The Bass Is Queen. is the debut studio album by Nigerian neo-soul singer-songwriter Lindsey Abudei. It was released on July 5, 2016 and serves as the follow-up to her 8-track debut EP, Brown (2013).

Critical reception

The album garnered relatively positive ratings among music critics. Joey Akan of Pulse Nigeria described the album as a "singer-songwriter's album". He rated the album 4 out of 5 stars and praised its overall production. In the same vein, Wilfred Okiche of 360 Nobs was impressed with the album's input and Abudei's songwriting skills, stating, "...And the bass is Queen is very relatable. Abudei's song writing is a refreshing break from the norm, simple with a hint of mystery that does not encroach into fake deep territory,[...]The finish is of international standard and the record can easily find life beyond the shores of Nigeria if marketed as such."

Track listing

Personnel
Producers
Atta Lenell Otigba – production (track 1, 2, 3, 4, 5, 6, 7, 8, 9, 10, 12)
Mosadoluwa Adegboye – production (track 11)
Mastering engineer
Mike Schoonmaker
A&R - Obinna Agwu 
Executive Producer - Ayo Ajayi

References

External links

2016 albums
Lindsey Abudei albums